Tolna sinifera is a species of moth of the family Noctuidae first described by George Hampson in 1913. It is found in Nigeria and South Africa.

References

Catocalinae
Insects of West Africa
Moths of Africa